Grove Karl Gilbert (May 6, 1843 – May 1, 1918), known by the abbreviated name G. K. Gilbert in academic literature, was an American geologist.

Biography
Gilbert was born in Rochester, New York and graduated from the University of Rochester. During the American Civil War, he was twice listed for the draft, but his name was drawn neither time. In 1871, he joined George M. Wheeler's geographical survey as its first geologist.

Rockies geologist

He then joined the Powell Survey of the Rocky Mountain Region in 1874, becoming Powell's primary assistant, and stayed with the survey until 1879. During this time he published an important monograph, The Geology of the Henry Mountains (1877).  After the creation of the U.S. Geological Survey in 1879, he was appointed to the position of Senior Geologist and worked for the USGS until his death (including a term as acting director).

Gilbert published a study of the former ancient Lake Bonneville in 1890 (the lake existed during the Pleistocene), of which the Great Salt Lake is a remnant. He named that lake after the army captain Benjamin L.E. de Bonneville, who had explored this region previously. The type of river delta that Gilbert described at this location has since become known to geomorphologists as a Gilbert delta.

Meteor Crater
In 1891, Gilbert examined the origins for a crater in Arizona, now known as Meteor Crater but then referred to as Coon Butte.  For a number of reasons, and against his intuition, he concluded it was the result of a volcanic steam explosion rather than an impact of a meteorite.  Gilbert based his conclusions on a belief that for an impact crater, the volume of the crater including the meteorite should be more than the ejected material on the rim and also a belief that if it was a meteorite then iron should create magnetic anomalies.  Gilbert's calculations showed that the volume of the crater and the debris on the rim were roughly equal.  Further there were no magnetic anomalies.  Gilbert argued that the meteorite fragments found on the rim were just "coincidence."  In 1892, Gilbert delivered his paper "The Moon's Face; A Study of the Origin of Its Features" as his retiring President's lecture to the Philosophical Society of Washington, and the paper was published in the Society's bulletin. Gilbert would publicize these conclusions in a series of lectures in 1895. Subsequent investigations would reveal that it was in fact a meteor crater, but that interpretation was not well established until the mid-20th century. As part of his interest in crater origins, Gilbert also studied the moon's craters and concluded they were caused by impact events rather than volcanoes, although he wondered why the craters were round and not oval as expected for an oblique impact. The interpretation of lunar craters as of impact origin was also debated until the mid-20th century.

Geomorphology

He joined the Harriman Alaska Expedition in 1899. Two weeks after the 1906 San Francisco earthquake, Gilbert took a series of photographs documenting the damage along the San Andreas fault from Inverness to Bolinas.

Gilbert is considered one of the giants of the sub-discipline of geomorphology, having contributed to the understanding of landscape evolution, erosion, river incision and sedimentation.  Gilbert was a planetary science pioneer, correctly identifying lunar craters as caused by impacts, and carrying out early impact-cratering experiments. He coined the term sculpture for a pattern of radial ridges surrounding Mare Imbrium on the moon, and correctly interpreted them in 1893 as ejecta from a giant impact.  Gilbert was one of the more influential early American geologists.

Awards
He won the Wollaston Medal from the Geological Society of London in 1900. He was elected as a member to the American Philosophical Society in 1902. He was awarded the Charles P. Daly Medal by the American Geographical Society in 1910.   Gilbert was well-esteemed by all American geologists during his lifetime, and he is the only geologist to ever be elected twice as President of the Geological Society of America (1892 and 1909).  Because of Gilbert's prescient insights into planetary geology, the Geological Society of America created the G.K. Gilbert Award for planetary geology in 1983.  Gilbert's wide-ranging scientific ideas were so profound that the Geological Society of America published GSA Special Paper 183 on his research (Yochelson, E.L., editor, 1980, The Scientific Ideas of G.K. Gilbert, fourteen separate biographical chapters, 148 pages).

Craters on the moon and on Mars are named in his honor, as is Mount Gilbert in Alaska, and another Mount Gilbert in California.

Publications
 "Report on the geology of the Henry mountains (1877)
 "Lake Bonneville" US Geological Survey Monograph No. 1. 1890. 438 p.
 "The Moon's face: a study of the origin of its features". Bulletin of the Philosophical Society of Washington (January 1898).
 "The Underground Water of the Arkansas Valley in Eastern Colorado" (1896)
 "Harriman Alaska Expedition, Volume 3: Glaciers and glaciation (1899)
 "The San Francisco Earthquake and Fire of April 18, 1906, and Their Effects on Structures and ..." (1907)
 "The transportation of débris by running water" US Geological Survey Professional Paper No. 86 (1914)
 "Bolinas" USGS photographs of San Andreas fault taken by Gilbert (1906)
 "Studies of Basin-Range structure" U.S. Geological Survey Professional Paper 153 (1928)

See also
 Gilbert (lunar crater)
 Gilbert (Martian crater)
 G. K. Gilbert Award of the Geological Society of America

References

Secondary sources
 Pyne, Stephen J. Grove Karl Gilbert: A Great Engine of Research. Austin: University of Texas Press, 1980.

External links

 

1843 births
1918 deaths
American geologists
American geomorphologists
Tectonicists
Grand Canyon history
University of Rochester alumni
Scientists from Rochester, New York
United States Geological Survey personnel
Wollaston Medal winners
Foreign Members of the Royal Society
National Geographic Society founders
Presidents of the American Association of Geographers
Presidents of the Geological Society of America